Amastra subsoror was a species of air-breathing land snail, a terrestrial pulmonate gastropod mollusc in the family Amastridae. It was endemic to Maui, Hawaii. It was described by George W. Tryon and Henry A. Pilsbry in their 1911 Manual of Conchology, and was last observed in 1946. It is thought to have gone extinct due to the introduction of predators to its habitat, the destruction of its habitat, and overcollecting.

References

subsoror
Extinct gastropods
Taxonomy articles created by Polbot
Taxa named by George Washington Tryon
Taxa named by Henry Augustus Pilsbry